Synodontis petricola, known as the cuckoo catfish, or the pygmy leopard catfish, is a species of upside-down catfish endemic to Burundi, Zambia, the Democratic Republic of the Congo, and Tanzania where it is only known from Lake Tanganyika.  It was first described by Belgian ichthyologist Hubert Matthes in 1959.  The species name "petricola" is derived from a combination of the Latin petra, meaning stone or rock, and the Latin cola, meaning inhabitant.  This refers to the rocky environment where this species is found.

Description 
Like all members of the genus Synodontis, S. petricola has a strong, bony head capsule that extends back as far as the first spine of the dorsal fin. The head contains a distinct narrow, bony external protrusion called a humeral process. The shape and size of the humeral process helps to identify the species. In S. petricola, the humeral process is triangular, rough, and is covered in many small, thin papillae. The bottom edge has a poorly-defined ridge on the bottom edge, and the top edge is convex. The humeral process ends in a sharp point.

The fish has three pairs of barbels. The maxillary barbels are on located on the upper jaw, and two pairs of mandibular barbels are on the lower jaw. The maxillary barbel has a narrow membrane attached near the base and is straight without any branches.

The skin of S. petricola has a large number of tiny vertical skin folds. The exact purpose of the skin folds is not known, but is a characteristic of the species of Syndontis that are endemic to Lake Tanganyika. External granular papilla are present on the head, but not the body.

The front edges of the dorsal fins and the pectoral fins of Syntontis species are hardened into stiff spines. The remaining portion of the dorsal fin is made up of seven dark branching rays. The spine of the pectoral fin is slightly curved, roughly as long as the dorsal fin spine, with large serrations on the back side. The pectoral spine ends in short, white filament. The rest of the pectoral fins are made up of eight to nine branching rays. The adipose fin is large, does not contain any rays, and has a convex shape. The pelvic fin contains one unbranched and six branched rays. The front edge of the pelvic fin is vertically aligned midway between with the back edge of the dorsal fin and the front edge of the adipose fin. The anal fin contains three to four unbranched and seven to nine branched rays; it is vertically aligned with the center of the adipose fin. The tail, or caudal fin, is forked, with rounded lobes, and contains eight rays on the upper lobe, nine rays on the lower lobe.

The mouth of the fish faces downward and has wide lips that contain papilla. All members of Syndontis have a structure called a premaxillary toothpad, which is located on the very front of the upper jaw of the mouth. This structure contains several rows of short, chisel-shaped teeth. In some species, this toothpad is made up of a large patch with several rows in a large cluster. In other species of Syndontis, this toothpad is clearly divided into two separate groups, separated by a thin band of skin that divides the toothpad. This character is used as a method of differentiating between to different but similar species of Syndontis. In S. petricola, the toothpad is interrupted, or clearly divided between the groups of teeth on the toothpad. On the lower jaw, or mandible, the teeth of Syndontis are attached to flexible, stalk-like structures and described as "s-shaped" or "hooked". The number of teeth on the mandible is used to differentiate between species; in S. petricola, there are 31 to 50 teeth on the mandible, arranged in a six short rows.

Some of the species of Synodontis have an opening or series of openings called the axillary pore. It is located on the side of the body below the humeral process and before the pectoral fin spine. The exact function of the port is not known to scientists, although its presence has been observed in seven other catfish genera. Fish in the genus Acrochordonichthys have been observed to secrete a mucus with toxic properties from their axillary pore, but there is no scientific consensus as to the exact purpose of the secretion or the pore.  S. petricola has a small axillary pore just below the humeral process.

The back of the fish is yellowish to copper-brown and is covered with large, irregularly-shaped black spots.  In juveniles, these spots can appear larger and sometimes intersect. The underside of the fish is lighter, with small, irregularly shaped spots.  Most of the species of Synodontis of Lake Tanganyika have a recognizable pattern consisting of dark triangles at the bases of all of the rayed fins, present in S. petricola, and the back edges of the fins are white in color. The caudal fin has a black bar that runs from the base of each lobe to the top of the fin. The barbels are white.

In general in Synodontis species, females tend to be slightly larger than males of the same age.

Habitat and behavior
The reproductive habits of most of the species of Synodontis are not known, beyond some instances of obtaining egg counts from gravid females. Spawning likely occurs during the flooding season between July and October, and pairs swim in unison during spawning. Juveniles appear to be carnivorous, feeding on water mites, seed shrimp, and insect larvae. Adults feed on algae scraped from rocks as well as small invertebrates. The growth rate is rapid in the first year, then slows down as the fish age. The pygmy leopard catfish practices brood parasitism. It lives among rock piles frequented by various species of mauna: small African cichlids. Courtship behaviour culminates with the female sucking sperm from the male's cloaca. She brings the sperm through her digestive tract to her cloaca, where her eggs meet the sperm. She then rushes into the nest of a cichlid, devours the eggs, and deposits her own. The cichlids then raise the catfish as their own.

References

External links 

petricola
Freshwater fish of Africa
Fish of Burundi
Fish of the Democratic Republic of the Congo
Fish of Tanzania
Fish of Zambia
Fish described in 1959
Taxa named by Hubert Matthes